Bracteacoccus helveticus is a species of green algae, in the family Bracteacoccaceae. Under its synonym Cryococcus helveticus, it was the only species in the genus Cryococcus.

References

Sphaeropleales